Philip R. Rosendahl (1893–1974) was the acting governor of the Danish colony of North Greenland from 1925 to 1928 and the governor from 1929 to 1939. A journalist by trade, he moved to Greenland in 1913, and began a lifelong career in the politics of the territory. From 1939 to 1950 he served as secretary, and helped reform the administration once north and south were combined.

References

1893 births
1974 deaths
Governors of Greenland
People from Guldborgsund Municipality
Danish people in Greenland